Djiarama is a Spanish 2007 documentary film.

Synopsis 
A team from the Canary Island NGO, Nimba, travels through Conakry, Guinea, screening the documentary Europa: ¿paraíso o espejismo? (Europe: Paradise or mirage?) in which five Sub-Saharan immigrants recount their experiences as they traveled from Africa to the coast of the Canary Islands. People from different social groups talk about the country's situation, what leads people to leave and the possible solutions to a conflict that, unfortunately, is very in force.

Awards 
 Docupolis 2007
 Docusur 2007

External links 

2007 films
Spanish documentary films
2007 documentary films
Documentary films about immigration
Films shot in Guinea
2000s Spanish films